

Secret Rocks is a locality in the  Australian state of South Australia located  on the Eyre Peninsula about  to the east  of the town of Kimba and about  north west of the state capital of Adelaide.

The locality was established on 26 April 2013 in respect to “the long established local name.”  Its name is derived from the former pastoral lease of the same name.

The land use within Secret Rocks is concerned with the use of the former pastoral lease as a protected area known as the Secret Rocks Nature Reserve which fully occupies its extent as of 2010.

The Refuge Rockholes Historic Reserve (Secret Rocks) is listed on the South Australian Heritage Register.

Secret Rocks is located within the federal Division of Grey, the state electoral district of Giles, the Pastoral Unincorporated Area of South Australia and the state’s Far North region.

History
During his crossing from Western Australia to Adelaide in 1841, explorer Edward John Eyre was very relieved to discover fresh water at a location he named "Refuge Rocks". In his Journal he wrote an account of his arrival at what is now better known as Secret Rocks:

"September 22.--Moving on the party for ten miles at a course of S. 35
degrees W., we passed through a dreadful country, composed of dense scrub
and heavy sandy ridges, with some salt water channels and beds of small
dry lakes at intervals. In many cases the margins bounding these were
composed of a kind of decomposed lime, very light and loose, which
yielded to the slightest pressure; in this our horses and drays sank
deep, throwing out as they went, clouds of fine white dust on every side
around them. This, added to the very fatiguing and harassing work of
dragging the dray through the thick scrub and over the heavy sand ridges,
almost knocked them up, and we had the sad prospect before us of
encamping at night without a blade of grass for them to eat. Just at this
juncture the native boy who was with me, said he saw rocks in one of the
distant sand hills, but upon examining the place with a telescope I could
not make out distinctly whether they were rocks or only sand. The boy
however persisted that there were rocks, and to settle the point I halted
the dray in camp, whilst I proceeded with him to the spot to look.

At seven miles W. 10 degrees S. of the drays we reached the ridge, and to
my great delight I found the boy was right; he had seen the bare sheets
of granite peeping out near the summit of a sandy elevation, and in these
we found many holes with water in them. At the base of the hill too, was
an opening with good grass around, and a fine spring of pure water.
Hastening back to the dray, I conducted the party to the hills, which I
named Refuge Rocks, for such they were to us in our difficulties, and
such they may be to many future travellers who may have to cross this
dreary desert."

References

Towns in South Australia
Eyre Peninsula
Far North (South Australia)
Places in the unincorporated areas of South Australia